HMS Cachalot (N83) was one of the six-ship class of Grampus-class mine-laying submarine of the Royal Navy. She was built at Scotts, Greenock and launched 2 December 1937. She served in World War II in home waters and the Mediterranean.  She was rammed and sunk by the Italian torpedo boat Generale Achille Papa on 30 July 1941.

Career

In August, 1940, Cachalot torpedoed and sank the German submarine U-51 in the Bay of Biscay and in September the German auxiliary minesweeper M 1604 / Österreich hit a mine laid by Cachalot and sank.

She was assigned to operate in the Mediterranean in 1941.

Sinking

Cachalot left Malta on 26 July, bound for Alexandria. At 2 o’clock on the morning of 30 July the Italian destroyer  was spotted causing her to dive. Upon resurfacing she was attacked by the Italian vessel. Cachalot attempted to dive again but the upper hatch jammed, and the Italian destroyer rammed her. The crew scuttled the ship as they abandoned her and all personnel except for a Maltese steward were picked up by the Italians.

References

Bibliography

External links
 HMS Cachalot from uboat.net

 

Grampus-class submarines
Ships built on the River Clyde
1937 ships
World War II submarines of the United Kingdom
Lost submarines of the United Kingdom
World War II shipwrecks in the Mediterranean Sea
Maritime incidents in July 1941
Submarines sunk by Italian warships